Anders Söderholm (born 26 October 1961) is the current rector of the Mid Sweden University and was a professor in Business administration at Umeå School of Business.
Söderholm obtained his PhD from Umeå University in 1991, with his thesis on organization of local industrial policies. On 2005 he became professor of business administration. Söderholm has also been a guest researcher at Stanford University, Royal Institute of Technology and Åbo Akademi University and is the chairman of The Swedish Project Academy. He was the rector of the Umeå School of Business between 2000-2003.

References

External links 
 Mid Sweden University Rector's blog (in Swedish)

1961 births
Living people
Swedish business theorists
Rectors of Mid Sweden University
Academic staff of Umeå University